East Damar is one of two Austronesian languages spoken on Damar Island and islets just to the south in Maluku, Indonesia. It is not closely related to the other language of Damar Island, the highly divergent West Damar language.

References 

Timor–Babar languages
Languages of the Maluku Islands